Zoltán Blum (also known as Zoltán Virág; 3 January 1892 – 25 December 1959) was a Hungarian amateur football (soccer) player who competed in the 1912 Summer Olympics.

Life
Blum was born in Pápa. He was a member of the Hungarian Olympic squad and played two matches in the consolation tournament. He was also part of the team at the 1924 Summer Olympics but did not play. He died in Budapest, aged 67.

References

1892 births
1959 deaths
People from Pápa
Hungarian Jews
Hungarian footballers
Jewish footballers
Hungary international footballers
Footballers at the 1912 Summer Olympics
Olympic footballers of Hungary
Ferencvárosi TC footballers
Hungarian football managers
Ferencvárosi TC managers
Hungarian expatriate football managers
Expatriate football managers in Romania
CA Oradea managers
FC UTA Arad managers
Hungarian expatriate sportspeople in Romania
Association football midfielders
Sportspeople from Veszprém County